Kheri Naru, also known as Naru Ki Kheri, derived its name from the name of famous saint NARU BABA  who lived there,  is a village located in Karnal Tehsil of Karnal district, Haryana, India.
“ Naru kheri,, is a Jaat village
Naru kheri Jaats are very daring 

The surrounding nearby villages and its distance from Kheri Naru are  Pingli (3 km), Chirao (5 km), Dadupur Roran (5.5 km), Himda (7.6 km), Barota (3 km), Sirsi (9 km), Birachpur (10.9 km), Zarifabad (11.3 km), Jani (3 km), Bazida Roran (2.5 km), Jundla (4 km), Gogripur (3 km), Budhanpur Abad (13.2 km), Hathlana (13.4 km), Manjoora (13.7 km), Behlolpur (14.0 km), Balu (15.2 km), Picholia (15.5 km), Buddanpur Viran (16.1 km), Jalala Viran (16.3 km), Katlaheri (16.7 km), Motia (17.1 km), Kuchpura (17.3 km), Bansa (17.5 km), Alipur Viran (17.6 km), Singhra (17.9 km), Prem Khera (18.7 km), Peont (19.1 km), Sambhali (19.4 km), Gularpur (20.1 km), Nising (21.3 km), Baras (22.8 km), Gonder (22.9 km), Bir Majra (23.8 km), Amupur (25.7 km), Dachar (26.9 km), Chakda (27.6 km), Bastali (28.1 km), Gohida (28.9 km), Gobindgarh (29.3 km).

Kheri Naru Sun rise time
Kheri Naru village is located in the UTC+5.30 time zone and it follows Indian standard time (IST). Kheri Naru sun rise time varies 22 minutes from IST.

Bus Service
A regular government bus service is available from Karnal to Kheri Naru at a regular interval of 1 hour.

A bus start 7:40 AM Naru kheri to gurugram and comes from gurugram to narukheri 7:00 pm

The nearest railway station in and around Kheri Naru

The nearest railway station to Kheri Naru is Karnal railway station which is located in and around 7.0 km. The following table shows other railway stations and distance from KHERI NARU village:
Karnal railway station (7.0 km)
Bhaini Khurd railway station (7.0 km)
Khiria Khurd railway station	(7.0 km)
Bazida Jatan railway station (5.0 km)

Nearest airport to Kheri Naru
Kheri Naru's nearest airport is Karnal Airport situated at 15.8 km. Few more airports around Kheri Naru are as follows:
Karnal Airport (15.8 km)
Sarsawa Air Base	(88 km)
Patiala Airport	 (107 km)
Indira Gandhi International Airport (150 km)

Nearest districts to Kheri Naru

Kheri Naru is located around 7 km away from its district headquarter Karnal. The other nearest district headquarters is Kaithal situated at 60 km distance from Kheri Naru. Surrounding districts from Kheri Naru are as follows:
 Saharanpur (U.P) district (90.0 km)
 Panipat  district (33.8 km)
 Kaithal district (65.5 km)
 Kurukshetra district (40 km)
 Yamuna Nagar district (68.7 km)

Schools in and around Kheri Naru

Kheri Naru nearest schools has been listed as follows:

 Government Higher Secondary School	(0.2 km)

 Pratap Public School, Jundla              (6 km)

 MNM Public School (7.5 km)

 Dyal Singh Public School, Karnal (10 km)

 Pratap Public School, Karnal             (10 km)

 DPS, Karnal (17 km)

References 

Villages in Karnal district